Events from the year 1810 in the United States.

Incumbents

Federal government 
 President: James Madison (DR-Virginia)
 Vice president: George Clinton (DR-New York)
 Chief justice: John Marshall (Virginia)
 Speaker of the House of Representatives: Joseph Bradley Varnum (DR-Massachusetts)
 Congress: 11th

Events

 May 1 – Macon's Bill Number 2 becomes law, intending to motivate Britain and France to stop seizing American vessels during the Napoleonic Wars.
 June 4 – The Society in Dedham for Apprehending Horse Thieves is founded in Dedham, Massachusetts.
 June 23 – John Jacob Astor forms the Pacific Fur Company.
 September 8 – The Tonquin sets sail from New York Harbor with 33 employees of John Jacob Astor's newly created Pacific Fur Company on board. After a 6-month journey around the tip of South America, the ship arrives at the mouth of the Columbia River and Astor's men establish the fur-trading post of Fort Astoria.
 September 23 –  The Republic of West Florida declares independence from Spain.
 October 27 – The United States annexes the Republic of West Florida.

Undated
 The first steamboat on the Ohio River sails.
 Rocky Point Manor is built in Harrodsburg, Kentucky.

Births

 April 10 – Willis Benson Machen, U.S. Senator from Kentucky from 1872 to 1873 (died 1893)
 April 17 – Joseph A. Wright, U.S. Senator from Indiana from 1862 to 1863 (died 1867)
 May 10 – James Shields, U.S. Senator from Illinois from 1849 to 1855, from Minnesota from 1858 to 1859 and from Missouri in 1879, born in Ireland (died 1879)
 May 23 – Margaret Fuller, Transcendentalist journalist, literary critic and women's rights advocate (drowned 1850)
 May 31 – Horatio Seymour, 18th Governor of New York, Democratic Party nominee for President of the United States in the presidential election of 1868 (died 1886)
 June 12 – David Levy Yulee, U.S. Senator from Florida from 1845 to 1851 and from 1855 to 1861 (died 1886)
 July 2 – Robert Toombs, U.S. Senator from Georgia from 1853 to 1861, 1st Confederate States Secretary of State (died 1885)
 July 5 – P. T. Barnum, showman (died 1891)
 August 6 – William Ticknor, publisher (died 1864)
 August 24 – Theodore Parker, preacher, Transcendentalist and abolitionist (died 1860)
 September 2 – William Seymour Tyler, educator and historian (died 1897)
 October 4 – Eliza McCardle Johnson, First Lady of the United States, Second Lady of the United States (died 1876)
 October 8 – James W. Marshall, contractor, builder of Sutter's Mill (died 1885)
 November 2 – Andrew A. Humphreys, general and civil engineer (died 1883)
 November 9 – Thomas Bragg, U.S. Senator from North Carolina from 1859 to 1861, 2nd Confederate States Attorney General (died 1872)
 November 25 – Charles E. Stuart, U.S. Senator from Michigan from 1853 to 1859 (died 1887)
 December 14 – John Burton Thompson, U.S. Senator from Kentucky from 1853 to 1859 (died 1874)
 December 25 – L. L. Langstroth, beekeeper (died 1895)

Deaths
 January 20 – Benjamin Chew, Chief Justice of colonial Pennsylvania (born 1722)
 February 22 – Charles Brockden Brown, novelist (born 1771)
 March 6 – William Washington, United States soldier (born 1752)
 October 13 – John Heath, politician (born 1758)
 October 15 – Alfred Moore, judge (born 1755)
 November 11 – John Laurance, attorney, statesman and judge (born 1750)
 December 14 – Cyrus Griffin, lawyer, judge, last President of the Continental Congress (born 1749)

See also
Timeline of United States history (1790–1819)

Further reading
 A. R. Beck. Notes of a Visit to Philadelphia, Made by a Moravian Sister in 1810. The Pennsylvania Magazine of History and Biography, Vol. 36, No. 3 (1912), pp. 346–361
 Governor Gerry's Latin Speech, 1810. Proceedings of the Massachusetts Historical Society, Third Series, Vol. 59, (October, 1925 – June, 1926),
 S. E. Morison. Forcing the Dardanelles in 1810: With Some Account of the Early Levant Trade of Massachusetts. The New England Quarterly, Vol. 1, No. 2 (April, 1928), pp. 208–225
 Erwin Stresemann. On a Collection of Birds from Georgia and Carolina Made about 1810 by John Abbot. The Auk, Vol. 70, No. 2 (April, 1953), pp. 113–117
 Edward C. Carter II. Birth of a political economist: Mathew Carey and the recharter fight of 1810–1811. Pennsylvania History, Vol. 33, No. 3 (July 1966), pp. 274–288
 J. Meredith Neil. "Plain and Simple Principles" for an American Art, 1810. The Pennsylvania Magazine of History and Biography, Vol. 93, No. 3 (July, 1969), pp. 410–416
 Richard W. Gronet. United States and the Invasion of Texas, 1810–1814. The Americas, Vol. 25, No. 3 (January, 1969), pp. 281–306
 Raymond A. Mohl. "The Grand Fabric of Republicanism" a Scotsman Describes South Carolina 1810–1811. The South Carolina Historical Magazine, Vol. 71, No. 3 (July, 1970), pp. 170–188
 Joseph Ewan. An Overlooked Printed "Catalogue of Plants in the Botanick Garden of South-Carolina," 1810. Taxon, Vol. 42, No. 2 (May 1993), pp. 365–367
 Joanna Bowen Gillespie. Filiopietism as Citizenship, 1810: Letters from Martha Laurens Ramsay to David Ramsay Jr.. Early American Literature, Vol. 29, No. 2 (1994), pp. 141–165

External links
 

 
1810s in the United States
United States
United States
Years of the 19th century in the United States